Lake Malawi, also known as Lake Nyasa in Tanzania and Lago Niassa in Mozambique, is an African Great Lake and the southernmost lake in the East African Rift system, located between Malawi, Mozambique and Tanzania.

It is the fifth largest fresh water lake in the world by volume, the ninth largest lake in the world by area—and the third largest and second deepest lake in Africa. Lake Malawi is home to more species of fish than any other lake in the world, including at least 700 species of cichlids. The Mozambique portion of the lake was officially declared a reserve by the Government of Mozambique on June 10, 2011, while in Malawi a portion of the lake is included in Lake Malawi National Park.

Lake Malawi is a meromictic lake, meaning that its water layers do not mix. The permanent stratification of Lake Malawi's water and the oxic-anoxic boundary (relating to oxygen in the water) are maintained by moderately small chemical and thermal gradients.

Geography
The lake has shorelines on western Mozambique, eastern Malawi, and southern Tanzania. The largest river flowing into it is the Ruhuhu River, and there is an outlet at its southern end, the Shire River, a tributary that flows into the very large Zambezi River in Mozambique. Evaporation accounts for more than 80% of the water loss from the lake, considerably more than the outflowing Shire River. The outflows from Lake Malawi into the Shire River are vital for the economy as the water resources support hydropower, irrigation and downstream biodiversity. Concerns have been raised over the future climate change impacts of Lake Malawi due to the recent decline in lake levels and the overall drying trend. The climate in the lake region is already experiencing changes, with the temperatures predicted to increase throughout the country.

The Lake Malawi National Park is located at the southern end of the lake.

Geological history

Malawi is one of the major Rift Valley lakes and an ancient lake. The lake lies in a valley formed by the opening of the East African Rift, where the African tectonic plate is being split into two pieces. This is called a divergent plate tectonics boundary. Malawi has typically been estimated to be 1–2 million years old (mya), but more recent evidence points to a considerably older lake with a basin that started to form about 8.6 mya and deep-water condition first appeared 4.5 mya.

During periods the lake dried out almost completely, leaving only one or two relatively small, highly alkaline and saline lakes in what currently are Malawi's deepest parts. A water chemistry resembling the current conditions only appeared about 60,000 years ago. Major low-water periods are estimated to have occurred about 1.6 to 1.0–0.57 million years ago (where it might have dried out completely), 420,000 to 250,000–110,000 years ago, about 25,000 years ago and 18,000–10,700 years ago.

Water characteristics
However, during the rainy season months of January to March, the waters are more muddy due to muddy river inflows.

European discovery and colonisation
The Portuguese trader Candido José da Costa Cardoso was the first European to visit the lake in 1846. David Livingstone reached the lake in 1859, and named it Lake Nyasa. He also referred to it by a pair of nicknames: Lake of Stars and Lake of Storms. The Lake of Stars nickname came after Livingstone observed lights from the lanterns of the fishermen in Malawi on their boats, that resemble, from a distance, stars in the sky. Later, after experiencing the unpredictable and extremely violent gales that sweep through the area, he also referred to it as the Lake of Storms.

On 16 August 1914, Lake Malawi was the scene of a brief naval battle when the British gunboat , commanded by a Captain Rhoades, heard that World War I had broken out, and he received orders from the British Empire's high command to "sink, burn, or destroy" the German Empire's only gunboat on the lake, the Hermann von Wissmann, commanded by a Captain Berndt. Rhoades's crew found the Hermann von Wissmann in a bay near Sphinxhaven, in German East African territorial waters. This very brief gunboat conflict was hailed by The Times in England as the British Empire's first naval victory of World War I.

Borders

Tanzania–Malawi dispute
The partition of the lake's surface area between Malawi and Tanzania is under dispute. Tanzania claims that the international border runs through the middle of the lake. On the other hand, Malawi claims the whole of the surface of this lake that is not in Mozambique, including the waters that are next to the shoreline of Tanzania. Both sides cite the Heligoland Treaty of 1890 between Great Britain and Germany concerning the border. The wrangle in this dispute occurred when the British colonial government, just after they had captured Tanganyika from Germany, placed all of the waters of the lake under a single jurisdiction, that of the territory of Nyasaland, without a separate administration for the Tanganyikan portion of the surface. Later in colonial times, two jurisdictions were established.

The dispute came to a head in 1967 when Tanzania officially protested to Malawi; however nothing was settled. Occasional flare-ups of conflict occurred during the 1990s and in the 21st century. In 2012, Malawi's oil exploration initiative brought the issue to the fore, with Tanzania demanding that exploration cease until the dispute was settled.

Malawi–Mozambique border
In 1954, an agreement was signed between the British and the Portuguese making the middle of the lake their boundary with the exception of Chizumulu Island and Likoma Island, which were kept by the British and are now part of Malawi.

Transport

 began service on the lake in 1901 as the SS Chauncy Maples: a floating clinic and church for the Universities' Mission to Central Africa. She later served as a ferry and is currently being renovated into a mobile clinic at Monkey Bay. The renovation was expected to be complete during the first half of 2014, but was halted in 2017.  entered service in 1935. The ferry  entered service in 1951. In recent years she has often been out of service, but when operational she runs between Monkey Bay at the southern end of the lake to Karonga on the northern end, and occasionally to the Iringa Region of Tanzania. The ferry  entered service in 1980. By 1982 she was carrying 100,000 passengers each year., but as of 2014 she was out of service. She normally serves the southern part of the lake but if Ilala was out of service she operated the route to Karonga. The Tanzanian ferry  was built in 1988. Her operator was the Tanzania Railway Corporation Marine Division until 1997, when it became the Marine Services Company Limited. Songea plies weekly between Liuli and Nkhata Bay via Itungi and Mbamba Bay. The worst Lake disaster was a ship accident by the MV Vipya in 1946 which resulted in 145 deaths.

Wildlife

Wildlife found in and around Lake Malawi or Nyasa includes Nile crocodiles, hippopotamus, monkeys, and a significant population of African fish eagles that feed off fish from the lake.

Fish

Fishing

Lake Malawi has for millennia provided a major food source to the residents of its shores since its waters are rich in fish. Among the most popular are the four species of chambo, consisting of any one of four species in the subgenus Nyasalapia (Oreochromis karongae, O. lidole, O. saka  and O. squamipinnis), as well as the closely related O. shiranus. Other species that support important fisheries include the Lake Malawi sardine (Engraulicypris sardella) and the large kampango catfish (Bagrus meridionalis). Most fishing provides food for the increasing human population near the lake, but some are exported from Malawi. The wild population of fish is increasingly threatened by overfishing and water pollution. A drop in the lake's water level represents another threat, and is believed to be driven by water extraction by the increasing human population, climate change and deforestation. The chambo and kampango have been particularly overfished (the kampango declined by about 90% from 2006 to 2016, O. karongae and O. squamipinnis by about 94%, and O. lidole might already be extinct) and they are now seriously threatened. The IUCN recognises 117 species of Malawi cichlids as threatened; some of these have tiny ranges and may be restricted to rocky coastlines only a few hundred metres long.

Cichlids

Lake Malawi is noted for being the site of evolutionary radiations among several groups of animals, most notably cichlid fish. There are at least 700 cichlid species in Lake Malawi, with some estimating that the actual figure is as high as 1,000 species. The actual number is labelled with some uncertainty because of the many undescribed species and the extreme variation among some species, making the task of delimiting them very complex. Except for four species (Astatotilapia calliptera, Coptodon rendalli, Oreochromis shiranus and Serranochromis robustus), all cichlids in the lake are endemic to the Malawi system, which also includes nearby smaller Lake Malombe and the upper Shire River. Many of these have become popular among aquarium owners due to their bright colors. Recreating a Lake Malawi biotope to host cichlids became quite popular in the aquarium hobby.

The cichlids of the lake are divided into two groups and the vast majority of the species are haplochromines. The sister species to the Malawi haplochromines is Astatotilapia sp. Ruaha (a currently undescribed species from Great Ruaha River), and these two separated between 2.13 and 6.76 million years ago (mya). The earliest divergence within the Malawi haplochromines occurred between 1.20 and 4.06 mya, but most radiations in this group are far younger; in extreme cases species may have diverged only a few hundred years ago. The Malawi haplochromines are mouthbrooders, but otherwise vary extensively in general behaviour and ecology. Within the Malawi haplochromines there are two main groups, the haps and the mbuna. Adult male haps generally display bright colors, while juveniles of both sexes and adult females typically show a silvery or grey coloration with sometimes irregular black bars or other markings. The second main haplochromine group are the mbuna, a name used both locally and popularly, which means "rockfish" in Tonga. They are found at rocky outcrops, territorially aggressive (although commonly found in high densities) and often specialised aufwuchs feeders.

The second group, the tilapia, comprises only six species in two genera in Lake Malawi: The redbreast tilapia (Coptodon rendalli), a widespread African species, is the only substrate-spawning cichlid in the lake. This large cichlid mainly feeds on macrophytes. The remaining are five mouthbrooding species of Oreochromis; four chambo in the subgenus Nyasalapia (O. karongae, O. lidole, O. saka and O. squamipinnis) that are endemic to the Lake Malawi system, as well as the closely related O. shiranus, which also is found in Lake Chilwa. The Malawi Oreochromis mainly feed on phytoplankton, reach lengths up to  depending on the exact species, and are mostly black or silvery-gray with relatively indistinct dark bars. Male chambo have unique genital tassels when breeding, which aid in egg fertilisation in a manner comparable to the egg-spots on the anal fin of haplochromines.

Non-cichlids

The vast majority of the fish species in the lake are cichlids. Among the non-cichlid native fish are several species of cyprinids (in genera Barbus, Labeo and Opsaridium, and the Lake Malawi sardine Engraulicypris sardella), airbreathing catfish (Bathyclarias and Clarias, and the kampango Bagrus meridionalis), mochokid catfish (Chiloglanis and Malawi squeaker Synodontis njassae), Mastacembelus spiny eel, mormyrids (Marcusenius, Mormyrops and Petrocephalus), the African tetra Brycinus imberi, the poeciliid Aplocheilichthys johnstoni, the spotted killifish (Nothobranchius orthonotus), and the mottled eel (Anguilla nebulosa).

At a genus level, most of these are widespread in Africa, but Bathyclarias is entirely restricted to the lake.

Invertebrates

Molluscs
Lake Malawi is home to 28 species of freshwater snails (including 16 endemics) and 9 bivalves (2 endemics, Aspatharia subreniformis and the unionid Nyassunio nyassaensis). The endemic freshwater snails are all members of the genera Bellamya, Bulinus, Gabbiella, Lanistes and Melanoides.

Lake Malawi is home to a total of four snail species in the genus Bulinus, which is a known intermediate host of bilharzia. A survey in Monkey Bay in 1964 found two endemic species of snails of the genus (B. nyassanus and B. succinoides) in the lake, and two non-endemic species (B. globosus and B. forskalli) in lagoons separated from it. The latter species are known intermediate hosts of bilharzia, and larvae of the parasite were detected in water containing these, but in experiments C. Wright of the British Museum of Natural History was unable to infect the two species endemic to the lake with the parasites. The field workers, who spent many hours on and in the lake, did not find either B. globosus or B. forskalli in the lake itself. More recently, the disease has become a problem in the lake itself as the endemic B. nyassanus has become an intermediate host. This change, first noticed in the mid-1980s, is possibly related to a decline in snail-eating cichlids (for example, Trematocranus placodon) due to overfishing and/or a new strain of the bilharzia parasite.

Crustaceans
Unlike Lake Tanganyika with its many endemic freshwater crabs and shrimp, there are few such species in Lake Malawi. The Malawi blue crab, Potamonautes lirrangensis (syn. P. orbitospinus), is the only crab in the lake and it is not endemic. The atyid shrimp Caridina malawensis is endemic to the lake, but it is poorly known and has historically been confused with C. nilotica, which is not found in the lake. Pelagic zooplanktonic species include two cladocerans (Diaphanosoma excisum and Bosmina longirostris), three copepods (Tropodiaptomus cunningtoni, Thermocyclops neglectus and Mesocyclops aequatorialis), and several ostracods (including both described and undescribed species).

Lake flies

Lake Malawi is famous for the huge swarms of tiny, harmless lake flies, Chaoborus edulis. These swarms, typically appearing far out over water, can be mistaken for plumes of smoke and were also noticed by David Livingstone when he visited the lake. The aquatic larvae feed on zooplankton, spending the day at the bottom and the night in the upper water levels. When they pupate they float to the surface and transform into adult flies. The adults are very short-lived and the swarms, which can be several hundred metres tall and often have a spiraling shape, are part of their mating behaviour. They lay their eggs at the water's surface and the adults die. The larvae are an important food source for fish, and the adult flies are important both to birds and local people, who collect them to make kungu cakes/burgers, a local delicacy with a very high protein content.

2015 mine leak
In January 2015, a sediment control tank collapsed at the Paladin Energy-owned uranium mine in Northern Malawi after a high intensity rain storm hit the area. It was revealed that approximately 50 litres of non radioactive material leaked into a local creek. Despite reports in local media of radioactive contamination the government conducted independent scientific tests on the local river system and found that there was no effect on the environment.

Swimming
The 25 km solo swim across Lake Malawi between Cape Ngomba and Senga Bay has been accomplished on 5 occasions by 16 swimmers

1992: Lewis Pugh 9hrs 52 minutes (UK/SA) and Otto Thanning (SA) 10hrs 5 minutes

2010: Abigail Brown (UK) 9hrs 45 minutes

2013: Milko van Gool (Netherlands) 8hrs 46 minutes and Kaitlin Harthoorn (US) 9hrs 17 minutes

2016: (current record) Jean Craven (SA), Robert Dunford (Kenya), Michiel Le Roux (SA), Samantha Whelpton (SA), Greig Bannatyne (SA), Haydn Von Maltitz (SA), Douglas Livingstone-Blevins (SA) 7hrs 53 mins 

2019: Chris Stapley (Eswatini) and Jay Azran (SA) 8hrs 40 minutes, Andrew Stevens (Australia) 10hrs 50 minutes, and Ruth Azran (SA) 11hrs 8 minutes.

In 2019, Martin Hobbs (SA), became the first person to swim the full length of Lake Malawi (54 days), as well as setting the world record for longest solo swim in a lake

See also

1989 Malawi earthquake
2009 Karonga earthquakes
Mtenje village
Southeast Africa

References

Further reading

Recent study on Lake Malawi water levels reveals drought 100,000 years ago

Growing up in a Border District and Resolving the Tanzania-Malawi Lake Dispute: Compromise and concessions, by Godfrey Mwakikagile, African Renaissance Press, 2022 

 
Ancient lakes
African Great Lakes
Lakes of the Great Rift Valley
Lakes of Malawi
Lakes of Tanzania
Malawi–Mozambique border
Malawi–Tanzania border crossings
International lakes of Africa
Ramsar sites in Mozambique
Lakes of Mozambique
Territorial disputes of Malawi
Territorial disputes of Tanzania